J. Herbert Moore House is a historic home located at Poplar Bluff, Butler County, Missouri. It was built in 1938, and is a two-story, irregular plan, International Style dwelling of wood and concrete construction with a stuccoed exterior. It has an attached garage and carport. It features original multi-light steel casement windows and original structural glass blocks.

It was listed on the National Register of Historic Places in 1998. It is located in the Cynthia-Kinzer Historic District.

References

Individually listed contributing properties to historic districts on the National Register in Missouri
Houses on the National Register of Historic Places in Missouri
International style architecture in Missouri
Houses completed in 1938
Houses in Butler County, Missouri
National Register of Historic Places in Butler County, Missouri